Knight of Wands or Batons is a card used in Latin suited playing cards which include tarot decks. It is part of what tarot card readers call the Minor Arcana. Tarot cards are used throughout much of Europe to play tarot card games.

In English-speaking countries, where the games are largely unknown, Tarot cards came to be utilized primarily for divinatory purposes.

Divination usage 
The questing knight, this man traditionally signifies travel, and progress. This also refers to new ideas and inventions. He looks forward, intelligent and knowledgeable, and yet ready for battle and full of fire. 

The reversed meaning of the card is insecurity and fear of revealing one's true self.

Key meanings
The key meanings of the Knight of Wands are: challenge, determination, foreign travel, leadership, and unpredictability.

See also
Spanish playing cards

References

Suit of Wands
Fictional knights